{{DISPLAYTITLE:CO2 content}}

 content (also known as "Total ") is a blood test that usually appears on a "Chem 19" or an electrolyte panel. The value measures the total dissolved Carbon dioxide in blood. It is determined by combining the Bicarbonate and the partial pressure of  multiplied by a factor which estimates the amount of pure  that is dissolved in its natural form (usually 0.03).

One given reference range is 24–32 mEq/L.

References

Blood tests